Tenderness is an outdoor white Carrara marble sculpture by , depicting a mother and child, installed at the corner of Sherbrooke and Peel streets in Montreal, Quebec, Canada.

The sculpture was created to depict two entities of equal significance showing their devotion to each other. The artist shows this through child kissing their mother's hands, and the mother kissing the child's head. It is said to stand as a symbol of indestructibility and invulnerability.

References

External links
 

Marble sculptures in Canada
Outdoor sculptures in Montreal
Sculptures of women in Canada
Statues in Canada
Sculptures of children